Fanderia is a railway station in Errenteria, Basque Country, Spain. It is owned by Euskal Trenbide Sarea and operated by Euskotren. It lies on the San Sebastián-Hendaye railway, popularly known as the Topo line.

History 
The station wasn't part of the line when it opened in 1912. It entered service provisionally with a single track on 5 March, and on 31 July trains started running on the second track.

Services 
The station is served by Euskotren Trena line E2. It runs every 15 minutes during weekdays and weekend afternoons, and every 30 minutes on weekend mornings.

References

External links
 

Euskotren Trena stations
Railway stations in Gipuzkoa
Railway stations in Spain opened in 2011
2011 establishments in the Basque Country (autonomous community)